Bjørkelangen is a lake in the municipality of Aurskog-Høland in Akershus county, Norway.

See also
List of lakes in Norway

Aurskog-Høland
Lakes of Viken (county)